Thaddeus Betts (1788–1840) was a U.S. Senator from Connecticut from 1839 to 1840. Senator Betts may also refer to:

Donald Betts (born 1978), Kansas State Senate
Mahlon Betts (1795–1867), Delaware State Senate